Lee Farr (born Leon Farb; April 10, 1927 – March 23, 2017) was an American actor best known for his starring role as Lt. Jimmy Conway in the television series The Detectives during the 1950s and 1960s.

Early years 
Farr was born Leon Farb in New York on April 10, 1927, to Rose ( Draisin) Farb and Jacob Farb, a photographer. He was raised in Brooklyn and graduated from Boys High School in the borough's Bedford–Stuyvesant neighborhood. He enlisted in the United States Navy before enrolling at Penn State University, where he received a bachelor's degree in geophysics. While at Penn State, he took some acting courses and acted in school plays.

Career 
Farr began his career as a geologist before transitioning to acting.

He appeared in The Detectives'''' first season. His other television work from the 1950 to the 1970s also included appearances on Perry Mason, Bonanza, Lassie, Mission: Impossible, The Rifleman, Laramie, Trackdown and M Squad. His film credits included Thundering Jets in 1958, Tarawa Beachhead in 1958, Lone Texan in 1959, and Gunfighters of Abilene'' in 1960.

Death 
Farr died from cancer at his home in the Woodland Hills neighborhood of Los Angeles, California, on March 23, 2017, at the age of 89. He was survived by his daughter, Denise Farr (wife of actor Don Gordon), whom he had with his first wife, actress Felicia Farr. He was predeceased by his sister, Lottie Kelban, and his half-brothers, Abe Caroff and Dave Caroff.

Filmography

References

External links 

Lee Farr at Find a Grave

1927 births
2017 deaths
American male film actors
American male television actors
American male stage actors
Burials at Mount Sinai Memorial Park Cemetery
Pennsylvania State University alumni
People from Brooklyn
People from Woodland Hills, Los Angeles
Boys High School (Brooklyn) alumni